Ilias Ahmed Chowdhury (15 August 1934 – 18 May 1991) was a Bangladesh Awami League politician and Member of Parliament from Madaripur-1.

Early life and family
Chowdhury was born on 15 August 1934 to a Bengali Muslim family of Chowdhuries in the village of Duttapara in Shibchar, Madaripur, then part of the Bengal Province's Faridpur district. His father, Nuruddin Ahmed Chowdhury, was a zamindar and his mother, Sheikh Fatema Begum, was a housewife. Ilias Ahmed Chowdhury had Iraqi Arab ancestry through his maternal grandfather Sheikh Lutfar Rahman, who was a direct descendant of 15th-century Muslim preacher Sheikh Awwal of Baghdad.

He was the paternal cousin of Prime Minister Sheikh Hasina. He was the nephew of President Sheikh Mujibur Rahman. His mother, Sheikh Fatema Begum, was the eldest sister of Sheikh Mujibur Rahman. Chowdhury was married to his first-cousin Sheikh Feroza Begum, the daughter of his mother's younger sister, Sheikh Asia Begum. Their sons Liton Chowdhury and Nixon Chowdhury are both politicians and members of parliament in Bangladesh.

Career
Chowdhury was elected to Parliament on 1991 Bangladeshi general election from Madaripur-1 as a Bangladesh Awami League candidate. His closest rival was Abul Khaer Chowdhury of the Jatiya Party.

Death and legacy
Chowdhury died in 1991 while in office. His son, Noor-E-Alam Chowdhury Liton, served was elected Member of  parliament from Madaripur-1 after his death. Ilias Ahmed Chowdhury Degree College is a college in Madaripur District named after him.

References

Awami League politicians
1991 deaths
5th Jatiya Sangsad members
1934 births
Bangladeshi people of Arab descent
Sheikh Mujibur Rahman family
People from Madaripur District